Mountain Ash is an electoral ward in Rhondda Cynon Taf, electing two councillors to Rhondda Cynon Taf County Borough Council. It was re-created by the merger of Mountain Ash East and Mountain Ash West, following a local government boundary review, effective from 5 May 2022, the date of the 2022 Welsh local elections.

The Mountain Ash ward covers the communities of Mountain Ash East and Mountain Ash West. It is a two-seat ward.

Background
Mountain Ash was created as an electoral ward to Mid Glamorgan County Council in 1988, subsequently electing a Plaid Cymru councillor, Pauline Jarman, at the 1989 and 1993 local elections.

Upon the creation of the new unitary authority of Rhondda Cynon Taf County Borough in 1996, Mountain Ash was divided between Mountain Ash East and Mountain Ash West wards.

2022 county borough election
At the 2022 Rhondda Cynon Taf County Borough Council election the council leader, Labour's Andrew Morgan, and the former leader (and leader of the Plaid Cymru group on the council) Pauline Jarman, were pitted against one another in the new ward. Morgan was the retiring councillor for Mountain Ash West and Jarman had been the councillor for Mountain Ash East. Morgan and fellow Labour candidate Wendy Treeby (who had also been a Mountain Ash West councillor) won the new seats.

Jarman had been a councillor for 46 years. After the result, she pledged to "wallow in the luxury of my family now" and spend her new free time finishing a book she had been writing.

References

Mid Glamorgan electoral wards
Mountain Ash, Rhondda Cynon Taf
Wards of Rhondda Cynon Taf